P C K Prem (P C Katoch) is an Indian poet, novelist, short story writer, editor and critic, writing in English and Hindi. He is a former academician, civil servant, and member of the Himachal Public Service Commission, Shimla.

Biography
P C K Prem (P C Katoch) born on 28 September 1945, at Garh Malkher, Palampur, Himachal, is an Indian Poet, novelist, short story writer, editor and critic writing in English and Hindi. He post-graduated from Panjab University, Chandigarh in 1970. He has one daughter Dr. Shivalik Katoch Pathania and a son P. Vikranta Jay Katoch. Presently, he lives with his wife Shakun in their farm at Palampur-176061, Himachal.

Literary career
An author of more than fifty books in English and Hindi, P C K Prem, a former academician, civil servant and Member, Public Service Commission, Shimla, Himachal, has published nine collections of poetry, seven novels and two collections of short fiction in English. A few significant works on criticism are:  Contemporary Indian English Poetry from Himachal (1992), English Poetry in India: A Comprehensive Survey of Trends and Thought-Patterns (2011), English Poetry in India: A Secular Viewpoint (2011), TEN Poetic Minds in Indian English Poetry and Time and Continuity (2016).  Creative writings in Hindi include twenty novels, nine books on short fiction, one collection of poetry and criticism. He is a recipient of more than twenty literary/social awards including the prestigious HP State Guleri & Academy Awards, and Bharat Hindi Rattan Award. His critical articles on poetry and fiction have appeared in numerous anthologies. Many literary journals of International repute have also published his critiques on poetry and fiction.
  
"Indeed, as a creative artist, PCK Prem has tremendous potential and vitality. In his writings he not only offers an exposé of our life in its shocking shallowness or outward show but  also provides, down deep, a philosophical prop or basis to sustain our life", says Dr Atma Ram, former Director of Education and Advisor to the Government of Himachal. Prem's novel A Handsome Man was short-listed in the year 2002 for International IMPAC Dublin Literary Award. Moreover, Prem bagged Academy Award for his novel in Hindi, Sangyaheen ; Guleri Award for Vanshdaan, Bharat Hindi Ratan Award for contribution to Hindi Literature with special reference to KaalKhand.

Published books in English

Poetry collection
 Among the Shadows (1989), Narinder Publications, New Delhi 
 Enigmas of an Identity (1990), Rachna Publications, Rajpur, Palampur   
 Those Distant Horizons (1993), Abhinav Publication, New Delhi 
 The Bermuda Triangles (1996), Writers Workshop, Calcutta 
 Oracles of the Last Decade (1998), Writers Workshop, Calcutta
 Rainbows at Sixty (2008), Prakash Book Depot, Bareilly
 Of This Age and Obscurity and Other Poem (2011),  Authorspress, New Delhi
 Tales of Half-men and Other Poems (2014), Authorspress, New Delhi 
 Collage of Life (A collection of Poems) (2016), Authorspress, New Delhi
 Yayati Returns & Other Poems (2017), The Poetry Society of India, Gurgaon
  and the time chases -poems personal and impersonal Authorspress, New Delhi 2018
 Collected Poems of P C K PREM in Four Volumes, Authorspress, New Delhi 2020

Novels
 Rainbows at Dawn (1991) Writers Workshop, Calcutta 
 A Night of Storms: Calcutta (1996), Writers Workshop, Calcutta 
 It Shall Be Green Again (1999), Writers Workshop, Calcutta 
 A Handsome Man (2001), Abhinav Publication, New Delhi 
 A Heart for the Man (2002), Book Enclave, Jaipur  
 Not Their Lives (2003) , Book Enclave, Jaipur

Short story
 Shadows at Dawn (1990), Writers Workshop, Calcutta 
 A Slinging Bag and other Stories (2011), Aavishkar Publishers, Jaipur
 Areas of Hope (A Collection of Stories) (2018), Authorspress, New Delhi
	Memorials and Other Stories ibid, 2020

Criticism
 Contemporary Indian English Poetry from Himachal (1992), Konark Publishers, New Delhi
 English Poetry in India: A Comprehensive Survey of Trends and Thought Patterns (2011), Authorspress, New Delhi
 English Poetry in India: A Secular Viewpoint (2011), Aavishkar Publishers, Jaipur 
 Editor -Struggling for Life (A collection of Poems of Dr Mahendra Bhatnagar) (2015), New Delhi 
 Ten Poetic Minds in Indian English Poetry (2016), Authorspress, New Delhi
 Time and Continuity (Twelve Contemporary Poets) (2016), Authorspress, New Delhi
 History of Contemporary INDIAN ENGLISH POETRY -AN APPRAISAL VOLUME I, Authorspress New Delhi 2019
 History of Contemporary INDIAN ENGLISH POETRY -AN APPRAISAL VOLUME II, Authorspress New Delhi 2019

Ancient Literature

 Light of Experience -Indian Literature and Universal Oneness (2013), Authorspress publication, New Delhi			 
 Selected Tales from the Great Epic MAHABHARATA (Many have not read) (2014), Cyberwit.net. publication    
 Folk Tales from Himachal (2017), Authorspress, New Delhi 
 Folk Tales from the Northern Region of India (2017), Authorspress, New Delhi
 THE LORD OF GODS VOLUME I (BASED  ON SRIMAD BHAGAVATA MAHAPURANA) AUTHORSPRESS NEW DELHI 2019
 THE LORD OF GODS VOLUME II (BASED  ON SRIMAD BHAGAVATA MAHAPURANA) AUTHORSPRESS NEW DELHI 2019
 As I Know - The Lord of the Mountains (Shiva Purana)
                  Authorspress, Delhi 2021

Books on P C K Prem
 P C K Prem –Echoing Time and Civilizations, Eds. Rob Harle, Sunil Sharma, Sangeeta Sharma, New Delhi: Authorspress Publication, 2015
 P C K Prem Ka Katha Sansar (The Fictional world of P C K Prem), Ed. Dr Jogindra Devi, Delhi: Nirmal Publications 2005
 P C K Prem –The Spirit of Age and Ideas in the novels of PCK Prem, Ed. Dr P V Laxmiprasad, New Delhi: Authorspress, 2016

Published books in Hindi

Poetry collection
 Indradhanush Shabd Ho Gaye, Praveen Prakashan, Delhi 1992

Novels
 Akash Mera Nahi, Praveen Prakashan, Delhi, 1988
 File Gawah Hai, Nalanda Prakashan, Delhi, 1988
 Dashansh, Anurag Prakashan, New Delhi, 1991
 Shankhnaad, Atma ram & Sons, Delhi, 1991 
 Vishmoh, Rajesh Prakashan, Delhi, 1992
 Sangyaheen, Jagatram & Sons, Delhi, 1992
 Chhote Chhote Riste, Sanmarg Prakashan, Delhi, 1993
 KhudaHua Adami, Jawahar Prakashan, Delhi, 1993
 Vanshdaan, Sanmarg Prakashan, Delhi, 1994
 Itne Baras Baad,  Nirmal Prakashan, Delhi, 1998  
 Kaalkhand, Nirmal Prakashan, Delhi, 2000  
[Five Volumes i.e. I.  Aastha II.  Manthan, III. Sangharsh, IV. Prayaschit, V. Pratishodh(2300 pages), (scholars of Hindi Literature consider it as one of the longest novels in Hindi)] 
 Adha Adhura Ek Din, Piyoosh Prakashan, Delhi, 1998
 Akash Aur Kauve, Bikram Prakahsan, Delhi, 2004

Short Stories
 Chhote Chhote Riste, Sanmarg Prakashan, Delhi, 1993
 Tinka Bhar Dard, Himachal Pustak Bhandar, Delhi, 1988
 Akritiaon Ke Beech, Archana Publication, Meerut, 1990 
 Awaazedited, Himotkarsh Prakashan, Una, HP 1989
 Dhundh Me Ugte Sooraj,  Rachna Publications, Palampur, 1990
 Riste, Bishanchand &Co., Delhi, 1998 
 Chopal Khamosh Hai,  Bishan chand & Company, 1998
 Teen Kadam Aur, Rajesh Prakashan, Delhi, 1999
Bhule biserei Sandharva, 2019 Pushpaanjali Prakashan, Delhi 110053

References

Further reading
Articles on the works of P C K Prem:

by D. C. Chambial 
 “Oracles of the Last Decade: Postcolonial Imaging of Human Suffering.” Postcolonial Readings in Indo-Anglian Literature. Ed. K.V. Dominic Delhi: Authorspress, 2009. Pages 57–63 Print.
  “PCK Prem’s Monto: An Exposition of Political and Ideological Sham: A study in Text.” Yking concise Encyclopedia of Language, Literature and Culture: Eds. Satendra Kumar, Manoj Kumar. Jaipur: Yking Books Jaipur, 2014 print Pages 25–53
 “P. C. K. Prem’s Enigmas of Identity: Poems of Beauty and Hope.” The Complexities of the Inner World, Studies on Six Indian Poets in English-
(Jayanta Mahapatra, Hazara Singh, P C K Prem, Gopikrishnan Kottor, Manas Bakshi, Chandramoni Narayanaswamy).Ed. K. V. Dominic
New Delhi: Authorspress, 2012. Pages 88–101 Print
 “P. C. K. Prem’s Monto: An Exposition of Political and Ideological Sham.” The Complexities of the Inner World, Studies on Six Indian Poets in English-
(Jayanta Mahapatra, Hazara Singh, PCK Prem, Gopikrishnan Kottor, Manas Bakshi, Chandramoni Narayanaswamy). Ed. K. V. Dominic. New Delhi: Authorspress, 2012. Pages 102-134 Print

by Jayshree Goswami and Mojibur Rahman.
 “Shams are Conditions, False is your Pitying and You Think Wildly to Infuse a Concrete Meaning: The Dystopian Society of P. C. K. Prem.” The Complexities of the Inner World, Studies on Six Indian Poets in English. New Delhi: Authorspress, 2012. Pages 88–101 Print Pages 135-149 Print.

by Jayshree Goswami
 “When a Man Ailing Along/Waiting for a Meaning/Lost Long Ago” P. C. K. Prem: A Study in Culture.” The Complexities of the Inner World, Studies on Six Indian Poets in English. Ed. K. V. Dominic. New Delhi: Authorspress, 2012. Pages 150-169 Print

by Aju Mukhopadhyay
 “For P. C. K. Prem Life, Full of Delusion and Illusion, is Pathetic.” The Complexities of the Inner World, Studies on Six Indian Poets in English. Ibid. 191-198. Print.

by Dr. Mallikarjun Patil
 “P. C. K Prem’s A Night of Storms as a Psychological Novel.” New Aspects of Indian Writing in English Eds. Dr. M.F. Patel & Dr. B. K. Sharma, Jaipur: Sunrise Publishers & Distributors, 2010. Pages 83–89 Print
 “P. C. K Prem’s A Night of Storms as a Psychological Novel.” Studies in Indian English Literature. Ed. Delhi: Sarup Book Publishers Pvt. Ltd., 2010 Pages 280-286 Print

by Dr. P.V. Laxmi Prasad
 “Philosophical Realizations in the Poetry of P. C. K. Prem” The Complexities of the Inner World, Studies on Six Indian Poets in English. Pages 170-190 Print.
 “Enigmas of Life in P. C. K. Prem’s Enigmas of An Identity.” Critical Evaluation of Contemporary Indian Poetry in English. Ed. K. V, Dominic. New Delhi: Access –an imprint of Authorspress, 2012 Pages 68–78 Print

by V.V.B. Rama Rao
 “Monto –A Fabulous Scoundrel: A Study of P. C, K. Prem’s Long Poem- Sensitivity and Cultural Multiplexity.” Recent Indian English Poetry. Jaipur: Aadi Publications, 2014 Pages 94–106 Print

by T. Vasudeva Reddy
 “Dynamics of Realism in the Poetry of P. C. K. Prem” The Complexities of the Inner World, Studies on Six Indian Poets in English. New Delhi: Authorspress, 2012. Pages 88–101 Print

by Suman Sachar
 “Prem’s Poetic Voice: A Search for Fusion through Confusion.” Indian English Poetry and Fiction (A Critical Evaluation). Eds. N. R, Gopal & Suman Sachar. Delhi: Atlantic Publishers and Distributors: 2000 Pages 178-184 Print

by Dr. Sishupal Sehgal
 “P. C. K. Prem’s Oracles of the Last Decade- Psychological Sufferings.” Critical Studies on Indian English Literature Volume 2 Jaipur: Mark Publishers 2010. Pages 250 -259
 “P. C. K. Prem’s Oracles of the Last Decade- Psychological Sufferings.” Critical Studies on Indian English Literature Volume 1 Jaipur: Pointer Publishers, 2010: Pages 163 -171 Print
 “P. C. K. Prem’s Oracles of the Last Decade- Physical Sufferings.” Critical Studies on Indian English Literature. Volume 2 Jaipur: Mark Publishers 2010 Pages 218 -226

by Dr Arvind M. Nawale
 "A Bureaucrat-turned Academician and a Creative Writer: The World of an IAS Officer and Passionate Poet: Literary Interview of P. C. K. Prem (P C Katoch). Ethics & Identity in Contemporary Indo-English Poetry. Eds. Capt. Dr Arvind M. Nawale, Dr Smita Jha, Dr Anindita Chatterjee. New Delhi: Authorspress, 2012. Pages 367-381 Print

External links
 Biography at boloji.com

1945 births
Living people
Indian male poets
English-language poets from India
Poets from Himachal Pradesh
English literature academics
People from Himachal Pradesh